The Union of Democratic Control was a British pressure group formed in 1914 to press for a more responsive foreign policy. While not a pacifist organisation, it was opposed to military influence in government.

World War I
The impetus for the formation of the UDC was the outbreak of the First World War, which its founders saw as having resulted from largely secret international understandings which were not subject to democratic overview. The principal founders were Charles P. Trevelyan, a Liberal government minister who had resigned his post in opposition to the declaration of war, and Ramsay MacDonald who resigned as Chairman of the Labour Party when it supported the government's war budget. Also taking a key role in setting up the Union were politician Arthur Ponsonby, author Norman Angell and journalist E. D. Morel. Following an initial letter circulated on 4 September 1914, an inaugural meeting was organised for 17 November. While non-partisan, the UDC was dominated by the left-wing of the Liberal and Labour Parties.

List of early supporters

Liberal Party
Charles Trevelyan MP
Philip Morrell MP
Arnold Rowntree MP
Arthur Ponsonby MP
Richard Denman MP
Hastings Lees-Smith MP
R.L. Outhwaite MP
Joseph King MP
E.T. John MP
Charles Buxton
Morgan Philips Price
E. D. Morel
Norman Angell
C. P. Scott
Graham Wallas
J. A. Hobson
Ottoline Morrell
George Cadbury
Konni Zilliacus
Bertrand Russell
Sophia Sturge

Labour Party
James Ramsay MacDonald MP
Frederick William Jowett MP
Philip Snowden MP
William Crawford Anderson MP
Frederick Pethick-Lawrence
Tom Johnston
David Kirkwood
Helena Swanwick
Isabella Ford
H. N. Brailsford
R. H. Tawney
Mary Agnes Hamilton
Margaret Bondfield
The Union did not call for an immediate end to the war but for a full examination of the war aims in public and by Parliament. It did strongly oppose conscription and wartime censorship along with other restrictions on civil liberties. As a result
of this, the UDC was denounced by right-wingers such as The Morning Post newspaper as undermining the British war effort. The Religious Society of Friends (Quakers) provided general backing and most of the funds for the Union came from wealthy Quakers. There were also close links between the Union and the supporters of women's suffrage.

By 1917 the UDC had more than a hundred local branches across Britain and Ireland, and 10,000 individual members; it also had affiliations from organisations which represented 650,000 more. It became increasingly influential in the Labour Party, to which its members increasingly graduated due to the continued support for the war from the Liberals. The UDC criticised the Versailles Treaty as being unjust to Germany, and also advocated the withdrawal of Allied troops from Russia. A. J. P. Taylor said the UDC was "the most formidable Radical body ever to influence British foreign policy".

Subsequent activity
At the end of the war, no thought was given to disbanding the Union and it continued to be active through the 1920s. In the first Labour government in 1924, fifteen Government ministers were members of the UDC.

As time went on, the UDC became more supportive of outright pacifism and Arthur Ponsonby published his pacifist statement Now is the Time in 1925 under UDC sponsorship. Ponsonby also started a petition of those who "refuse to support or render war service to any government which resorts to arms", and in 1928 published Falsehood in War-Time which claimed that public opinion was invariably peaceful unless roused by propaganda.

In the 1930s the UDC was led by Dorothy Woodman who reshaped it as an anti-fascist research and propaganda campaigning group. Membership was on a steep decline by this point. While the Union continued to exist in some form until the 1960s  Harold Wilson was briefly a UDC member in the 1950s it had very little influence.  It finally dissolved in 1966.

Secretaries
1914: E. D. Morel
1925: Stella Retinger
1928: Dorothy Woodman

See also
 Antimilitarism
 Anti-war movement
 Opposition to World War I

References

External links
 Catalogue of the Edmund Morel papers at the Archives Division of the London School of Economics
 Catalogue of the Union of Democratic Control papers at Hull History Centre

Anti-fascist organisations in the United Kingdom
Anti-militarism in Europe
Peace organisations based in the United Kingdom
Political advocacy groups in the United Kingdom
Organizations established in 1914
Organizations disestablished in 1966